There have been four baronetcies created for persons with the surname St John, two in the Baronetage of England and two in the Baronetage of Great Britain. Three of the creations are extant as of 2008.

The St John Baronetcy, of Lydiard Tregoze in the County of Wiltshire, was created in the Baronetage of England on 22 May 1611. For more information on this creation, see Viscount Bolingbroke and St John.

The St John Baronetcy, of Woodford in the County of Northampton, was created in the Baronetage of England on 28 June 1660. For more information on this creation, see Baron St John of Bletso.

The St John Baronetcy, of Longthorpe in the County of Northampton, was created in the Baronetage of Great Britain on 10 September 1715 for Francis St John. The title became extinct on his death in 1756.

The St John, later St John-Mildmay Baronetcy, of Farley in the County of Southampton, was created in the Baronetage of Great Britain on 9 October 1772. For more information on this creation, see St John-Mildmay baronets.

St John baronets, of Lydiard Tregoze (1611)
see Viscount Bolingbroke

St John baronets, of Woodford (1660)
see Baron St John of Bletso

St John baronets, of Longthorpe (1715)

Sir Francis St John, 1st Baronet (–1756)
Title extinct.

St John, later St-John Mildmay baronets, of Farley (1772)
see St John-Mildmay baronets

References

Kidd, Charles, Williamson, David (editors). Debrett's Peerage and Baronetage (1990 edition). New York: St Martin's Press, 1990.

Baronetcies in the Baronetage of England
Baronetcies in the Baronetage of Great Britain
Extinct baronetcies in the Baronetage of Great Britain
1611 establishments in England
St John family